Rubén Pulido Peñas (born 2 September 2000) is a Spanish professional footballer who plays as a central defender for SD Huesca.

Club career
Pulido was born in Madrid, and joined Real Madrid's La Fábrica in July 2018, from Fútbol Alcobendas Sport. On 17 July of the following year, after finishing his formation, he was loaned to Segunda División B side CF Rayo Majadahonda for the season.

Pulido made his senior debut on 8 September 2019, coming on as a second-half substitute in a 2–1 home win against CD Atlético Baleares. Roughly one year later, he agreed to a four-year deal with CF Fuenlabrada in Segunda División.

Pulido made his professional debut on 13 September 2020, replacing fellow debutant Tahiru Awudu in a 2–0 home win against CD Lugo. He scored his first goal on 19 December, netting the opener in a 3–2 away win over RCD Mallorca.

On 29 August 2022, after Fuenlas relegation, Pulido signed a three-year deal with SD Huesca also in division two.

References

External links

2000 births
Living people
Footballers from Madrid
Spanish footballers
Association football defenders
Segunda División players
Segunda División B players
Real Madrid Castilla footballers
CF Rayo Majadahonda players
CF Fuenlabrada footballers
SD Huesca footballers